Clypeodytes dilutus is a species of predaceous diving beetle found in India,  Sri Lanka, Thailand, and Vietnam.

References 

Dytiscidae
Insects of Sri Lanka
Insects described in 1882